Świętosław is a Slavic name used in Poland.

Świętosław may also refer to:

Świętosław, Golub-Dobrzyń County in Kuyavian-Pomeranian Voivodeship (north-central Poland)
Świętosław, Toruń County in Kuyavian-Pomeranian Voivodeship (north-central Poland)
Świętosław, West Pomeranian Voivodeship (north-west Poland)
Świętosław, Włocławek County in Kuyavian-Pomeranian Voivodeship (north-central Poland)

See also
 Sviatoslav, a variant of the name
 Świętosława, a Polish princess